Howard Dwaine Dorough (born August 22, 1973) is an American singer. He is a member of the pop vocal group Backstreet Boys.

Early life
Dorough was born August 22, 1973, in Orlando, Florida, where he met his friend and bandmate A.J. McLean through a mutual vocal coach at the Latin carnival in 1989. His mother Paula Flores-Dorough, a school worker, is Puerto Rican, and his father, Hoke Dwaine Dorough (1938–2008), a police officer, former army soldier, real estate developer  and bank security, was Irish American. He is the youngest by 10 years of five siblings. His sister, Pollyanna, is also a singer. Another sister, Caroline, died from lupus in September 1998.

Career

Early career
Dorough's love and passion for entertainment started when he was three years old, singing "Babyface" with his little guitar. He started performing around age six or seven, thanks to his sister Polyanna, singing during mass in the church choir and having his first role in the musical adaptation of The Wizard of Oz as a singer and actor. Throughout elementary school, his mother enrolled him in children's community theaters and performed in many community theater productions of top musicals, among them "Sound Of Music", "Showboat" and "Camelot" and got him in singing/voice and acting lessons by putting him in a performing arts academy where he also took dance lessons in classical ballet, tap, and jazz. He even was in an all-boy ballet troupe. He did Little League once before switching to the arts. During junior high to high school, Dorough also did some singing in the choir, even qualified for All-State Chorus, talent shows, and joining drama club and acting school productions, as well as a school TV show called "Macho & Camacho". He got discovered by an acting agent when he was 14 and also managed to land roles in movies, such as Parenthood starring comedian Steve Martin at 15 and Cop and a Half starring Burt Reynolds, Nickelodeon TV production pilot "Welcome Freshman" and star in a commercial for Disney World under the stage name, Tony Donetti. He didn't particularly like this, but his agent thought he was Italian and believed it would help him to get discovered. Although he enjoyed it his entire life, like his bandmates AJ and Nick, he too was a victim of bullying as a child for his lack of Spanish language, his falsetto vocal range when he was 12 and his weight.

Dorough was asked by his choir teacher to perform the National Anthem at his high school basketball game.  He agreed but forgot the words when it was time to sing. Despite the extreme embarrassment, he got right back on his horse and began performing again when he sang 'Unchained Melody' at his school talent show, and got a standing ovation when he hit the high note. Girls had tears in their eyes and boys looked on in envy. Dorough was note-perfect and, this time, he was word perfect too. His national anthem mess was forgotten as the screams filled the auditorium and everyone jumped to their feet. He also auditioned for a Latin boy band Menudo, but he did not make it. He was also involved in a peer counseling group called Friends, where he talked to other kids about living "a clean life, having fun, going to school, avoiding drugs." When he's not working in the spotlight, he works as a tour guide in Universal Orlando and worked with his sister at Zarro's Bread Basket one summer in New York when he was 14.

He was selected 'Most Talented' and graduated from Edgewater High School in 1991 the Top 10 of his class. After high school, Dorough auditioned for Backstreet Boys under his stage name, but they lost his headshot and contact info; however, after six months, they were able to track him down, thanks to AJ, and was already in the group. He got a scholarship, and attended both University of Central Florida and Valencia College with an Associate of Arts Degree with *NSYNC member, Chris Kirkpatrick.

Backstreet Boys

Lou Pearlman created the Backstreet Boys in 1993, selecting Howie Dorough along with AJ McLean, Brian Littrell, Nick Carter, and Kevin Richardson. They were then booked to perform at many venues such as high schools and shopping malls and eventually managed to sign a contract with Jive Records in 1994. They slowly became popular in European countries, starting with Germany, and embarked on a tour supporting their debut album. The album slowly climbed up to the top ten slots in most countries and was on its way to selling more than 8 million copies.

As their second album, Backstreet's Back was being released in Europe, they released their first album in the United States which was a compilation of both their international debut and Backstreet's Back. The album climbed to No. 4 on the  Billboard 200 and sold over 14 million copies. Meanwhile, Backstreet's Back became an even more significant success than their debut album, opening at the number one spot in many countries.

Dorough is most known for his infamous fart, which was recorded and used as a part of the beat for the song "The Call" from the Backstreet Boys' fourth album, Black And Blue.

They started recording Millennium in 1998 and released it in May 1999. It became one of the biggest selling albums of all time taking the number one place in many countries. Their first single from Millennium'''s follow-up album, Black & Blue, Shape Of My Heart was released to radio on October 3. Black and Blue recorded first-week sales of 1.59 million copies in the US, making the Backstreet Boys the first artists to back-to-back million-plus sales of albums.

After releasing their greatest hits album they went on hiatus and regrouped in 2003. They released their next album, Never Gone in 2005. While it was negatively reviewed by critics it enjoyed a lot of commercial success. They released their next album, Unbreakable in 2007 and the follow-up This Is Us, in 2009. Their eighth album In a World Like This was released on July 30, 2013. Their ninth album  DNA was released on January 25, 2019, with a new headlining tour to follow in May of the same year. All in all, they have become one of the biggest selling artists of all time with record sales exceeding 135 million worldwide.

Solo projects
Dorough worked as a producer for singer/songwriter George Nozuka and Katelyn Tarver as part of his management partnership with former 3deep member CJ Huyer, called HC Entertainment formed in 2004. Since 2010 he's also managing a Canadian band Neverest, which was under Dorough's company, 3 Street Management.

In 2006, he started work on his first solo album. The album would include Spanish/Latin songs as well as American. But he eventually changed his mind on the style of the album. Noting that his Spanish was not the best and did not want to be something he is not. Around 2010, he started to work on an album that was more pop/r&b style. Dorough's first solo album Back to Me was eventually released on November 15, 2011. The album featured many songs that Dorough co-wrote himself. The first single of the album, "100", was released in the summer of 2011 and received moderate airplay primarily in Canada. Also in November 2011, Dorough joined Britney Spears for her Femme Fatale Tour in South America.

In 2015, while Howie had not announced that he was working on a second solo album some producers mentioned working with Howie on a new album that is said to be released the same year. On May 9, 2019, he announced on Twitter and Instagram that his new solo album, "Which One Am I" will be released on July 12, 2019.

TV and film appearances
While in the Backstreet Boys, Dorough has done some acting over the years. Appearing in Roswell, ABC's television series Sabrina, the Teenage Witch in the episode "The Big Head" as an egotistic rock star named Strum, and voiced Santa Claus on the Nickelodeon preschool animated series Dora the Explorer in the Christmas episode "A Present for Santa" and did a skit on Saturday Night Live on May 15, 1999. In September 2002, Dorough and the rest of The Backstreet Boys made special guest appearances on the children's cartoon Arthur. In 2013, Dorough made his motion picture debut by appearing in the comedy This Is the End along with the rest of the Backstreet Boys. On February 5, 2021, Dorough appeared on Long Island Medium: There in Spirit to receive a psychic reading from Theresa Caputo about his father and sister. On February 1, 2022, Dorough competed in a dance competition for Dirty Dancing on Fox.

Other ventures
Dorough also founded a company called Sweet D, Inc. with his older brother John. The company specializes in real estate development and consulting and has built numerous condominiums, hotels, and waterfront properties. He's also founded and held the positions of CEO, chairman, and director in several other companies, most notably Dorough Lupus Foundation and Howiedoit Productions, Inc.

Early in 2020, Dorough starred in a musical loosely based on his life called Howie D: Back in the Day'' at The Rose Theater in Omaha, Nebraska. In the show, Dorough's sister, Pollyanna, was played by Natalie Hanson and his Mother was played by Christina Maria.

Personal life
In September 1998, Dorough's sister, Caroline Dorough-Cochran, died of lupus. After her death, Dorough established the Dorough Lupus Foundation (DLF) in her honor to help raise money for lupus research. Howie did many charity events for the foundation including concerts, auctions, and some annual cruises. The foundation helps raise awareness about the disease, provides financial support for those who cannot afford treatment, and raises money for research.

According to the band's YouTube page, he has Scandinavian, African, Iberian, Native American, Central and South American, Scottish, Welsh, Balkan, and Middle Eastern ancestry.

Relationships
Dorough has been private about his romantic connections. According to "Entertainment Tonight", he dated his singing partner Jennifer during his final year of high school, but they broke up due to his career in 1994, leaving him heartbroken. While touring Europe in 1995 or 1996, he briefly dated a woman named Sabina and then dated a Canadian model named Claudia Opdenkelder. He stated, "I had come out of a relationship, so I wasn't looking for anything serious."

On December 6, 2000, Dorough met Leigh Anne Boniello, a film executive producer for Warner Brothers and Dreamworks, who was working as the webmaster for the official Backstreet Boys website at the time. Howie and Leigh dated for six years and in 2006 he proposed to her in front of her family on New Year's. A year later, on December 8, 2007, they married in a traditional Catholic ceremony at St. James Cathedral, where he was baptized and sang choir at in Orlando, Florida. They have two sons together. Dorough and his wife help recently launch her first line of ecofriendly handbags called Eslla, a luxury company she designed and founded with her friend of more than a decade, Charlotte Wienckoski.

Discography

Albums

Singles

Collaborations
 "Every Minute, Every Hour" (co-writer) (2gether)
 "Show Me What You Got" (Bratz featuring BoA and Howie Dorough)
 "I'll Be There" (Howie Dorough featuring Sarah Geronimo)
 "It Still Matters ~愛は眠らない(Ai wa Nemuranai)~" (The Gospellers featuring Howie Dorough)
 "I Like It" (co-writer) (So Real, Mandy Moore)
 "If I Say" (Howie Dorough featuring U)
 "Worth Fighting For" (Howie Dorough featuring U)
 "New Tomorrow" (featuring Howie D) (A Friend in London feat Howie Dorough)

Filmography

See also

 Backstreet Boys
 List of Puerto Ricans

Notes

References

External links
 
 
 

1973 births
Living people
Florida Republicans
20th-century American singers
21st-century American singers
Backstreet Boys members
Countertenors
American people of Irish descent
American people of Puerto Rican descent
Hispanic and Latino American musicians
Singers from Orlando, Florida
20th-century American male actors
21st-century American male actors
Edgewater High School alumni
Valencia College alumni
American male pop singers
Jive Records artists
RCA Records artists
NKOTBSB members